An Old Etonian is a gin cocktail which enjoyed great popularity in London, circa 1925.  The cocktail takes its name from Eton College and from the college's alumni, who are often referred to as Old Etonians.  The Garden Hotel in London is an example of an establishment that had mastered the Old Etonian cocktail during that era.

Recipe and preparation
  Gin (1.5 oz.);
  Kina Lillet (1.5 oz.); (Cocchi Americano is considered an acceptable substitute for Kina Lillet, which is no longer available.)
  Orange bitters (2 dashes);
  Crème de Noyaux (2 dashes);
  Shake with ice and strain into a stemmed cocktail glass.  Garnish with a twist of orange peel.
The almond liqueur and bitters should be added only if using the modern version of Lillet.  They are not necessary when using Cocchi Americano.

See also
 List of cocktails

References 

Cocktails with wine
Cocktails with gin
Eton College
Cocktails with bitters
Cocktails with liqueur